Pseudolimnophila is a genus of crane fly in the family Limoniidae.

Species
Subgenus Calolimnophila Alexander, 1921
P. alboapicata Alexander, 1955
P. comes Alexander, 1930
P. imperita Alexander, 1949
P. interstincta Alexander, 1956
P. mauritiana Alexander, 1954
P. niveicoxa Alexander, 1958
P. octoseriata Alexander, 1951
P. princeps Alexander, 1921
P. rex Alexander, 1920
P. sottiauxi Alexander, 1956
P. subimperita Alexander, 1976
P. subprinceps Alexander, 1972
P. xanthomelania Alexander, 1960
Subgenus Pseudolimnophila Alexander, 1919
P. apicinigra Alexander, 1936
P. aurantiaca Alexander, 1920
P. auranticollis Alexander, 1958
P. auripes Alexander, 1931
P. australina Alexander, 1927
P. bisatrata Alexander, 1950
P. brunneinota Alexander, 1933
P. chikurina Alexander, 1930
P. chrysopoda Alexander, 1949
P. cinctifemur Alexander, 1920
P. compta Alexander, 1930
P. concussa Alexander, 1936
P. contempta (Osten Sacken, 1869)
P. costofimbriata Alexander, 1927
P. descripta Alexander, 1928
P. dravidica Alexander, 1974
P. dundoensis Alexander, 1963
P. ebullata Stary, 1982
P. eremnonota Alexander, 1960
P. ernestina Alexander, 1953
P. exsul Alexander, 1950
P. flavithorax Alexander, 1956
P. frugi (Bergroth, 1888)
P. fusca (Brunetti, 1918)
P. glabra (Brunetti, 1918)
P. honesta (Brunetti, 1912)
P. illegitima Alexander, 1931
P. inconcussa (Alexander, 1913)
P. inornata (Osten Sacken, 1869)
P. kambaitiae Alexander, 1954
P. legitima Alexander, 1931
P. lucorum (Meigen, 1818)
P. luteipennis (Osten Sacken, 1860)
P. luteitarsis Alexander, 1930
P. megalops Alexander, 1942
P. melanura Savchenko, 1984
P. monomelania Alexander, 1963
P. multipunctata (Brunetti, 1912)
P. noveboracensis (Alexander, 1911)
P. nycteris Alexander, 1937
P. pallidicoxa (Brunetti, 1912)
P. palmeri (Alexander, 1915)
P. pluto Alexander, 1939
P. plutoides Alexander, 1948
P. polytila Alexander, 1955
P. productivena Alexander, 1951
P. projecta Alexander, 1937
P. rhanteria Alexander, 1927
P. rhodesiae (Alexander, 1921)
P. senex Alexander, 1920
P. seniorwhitei Alexander, 1927
P. sepium (Verrall, 1886)
P. seticostata Alexander, 1936
P. spatiosa Alexander, 1965
P. subaurantiaca Alexander, 1956
P. subhonesta Alexander, 1974
P. supplementa Alexander, 1945
P. telephallus Alexander, 1957
P. varipes Alexander, 1920
P. xantha Alexander, 1955
P. zelanica Alexander, 1958

References

Limoniidae